FXpansion is a Ltd company that produces music software including Geist2, Strobe2, Tremor, Etch, Bloom, Maul and DCAM Dynamics.

History 
FXpansion is a company that develops music software, and was founded in 1999 in London, United Kingdom. Their base of operations from 2005-2009 was in London's inner East End, in the media/bar zone of Shoreditch. In 2008, FXpansion opened a US subsidiary, FXpansion USA Inc, to handle sales and distribution in North America, and a development office in Australia. In 2009, FXpansion relocated their HQ to London's South Bank.

On 1 September 2016, it was announced that fellow London based music technology company ROLI had acquired FXpansion.

In April 2020, ROLI sold FXpansion instrument BFD to InMusic Brands.

Industry Awards 
 BFD1 - Electronic Musician Editors' Choice Award 2005
 BFD2 - Electronic Musician Editors' Choice Award 2008
 Geist - Electronic Musician Editors' Choice Award 2012
 BFD3 - Electronic Musician Editors' Choice Award 2014

References

Software companies of the United Kingdom
Software companies established in 1999
1999 establishments in England
Companies established in 1999
Companies based in London